The royal flags of Thailand are personal royal flags that are usually flown in Thailand, along with the national flag, to honor the King and royal family. Unlike the royal standards displayed only in special ceremonies and in particular locations, the royal flags are seen throughout Thailand. They are not commonly seen outside the country.

Description
The main royal flags are that of the King of Thailand, Maha Vajiralongkorn, known as the "Tenth king" (Rama X), and his consort Queen Suthida. The flag of the previous monarch King Bhumibol Adulyadej and the flag for Queen Dowager Sirikit is still widely used. These flags are in plain colors with their respective royal cyphers. Other members of the royal family, like Princess Maha Chakri Sirindhorn and Princess Chulabhorn Walailak also have their own plain-color flags, but these are not seen very often, except at ceremonies personally led by them.

The royal flags are not only used officially, but also unofficially. They are displayed by Thai citizens of any social class or background at any location, usually beside the Thai flag, as a homage to their King. Honoring the royal family is a characteristic feature of Thai culture.

These flags are sold at most small stores and grocery stores in every town and village of Thailand. They come in many different sizes. Usually the symbol is printed only on one side of the flag.

Flag of the King

The King's flag is in yellow, the color of Monday, the day of his birth. It always has a symbol in the middle. There are a variety of symbols, but recently most king's flags have different symbols, such as the symbol marking King Bhumibol's 80th birthday or the one commemorating the 60th anniversary of King Bhumibol's accession to the throne.

Both emblems in the center of the flag are quite complex, involving Buddhist iconography and ancient royal symbols of authority as well, such as the multi-tiered white umbrella. The king's symbols are always topped by the royal crown. Sometimes light rays are emanating from the top of the crown, these are also an element of royal symbology. In simplified versions of the flag the central symbol may come simply outlined in red.

Yellow is the color identified with the king in Thailand (as well as the previous king, both were born on a Monday). Many Thais like to wear yellow shirts as an informal homage to their king, especially on Mondays, the day of his birth.

Flag of the Queen
Queen Suthida's flag Patcharasutha Phimonlak is purple It's the color of Saturday And on the birth day, there is a symbol "ส.ท." in the middle. The symbol is the abbreviation of Her Majesty Queen Suthida Patcharasutha Phimonlak (ส.ท. : สุทิดา) under the Royal Crown This flag has been in effect from June 2019 until now. After the royal coronation ceremony

List of Royal Flags

See also
King of Thailand
Royal Standard of Thailand
List of Thai flags
List of Military flags of Thailand

Notes and references

External links

Chakri dynasty
 2
Thai monarchy
Thai culture